Louis "Loek" Biesbrouck (20 February 1921 – 20 December 2005) was a Dutch footballer, who played as a midfielder.

Club career 
Biesbrouck joined RCH at the age of ten, and made his debut for the first team in 1938, at the age of seventeen. A one-club man, he spent his whole career at RCH, which spanned 21 years. During his first years, he helped bring the team back to the Dutch first division. In the 1952–53 season, he achieved the high point of his club career by winning the Netherlands Football League Championship, which was the first for RCH since the 1922–23 season.

Despite offers from both national and foreign clubs, Biesbrouck always remained an amateur player, even after professionalism was introduced to Dutch football in 1954. He said that someone playing professional football is no longer a sportsman, but rather a slave.

After his career, he was appointed honorary member of RCH.

International career 
Biesbrouck was selected for the Dutch squad at the 1948 Summer Olympics, but did not make an appearance. He eventually made his debut for the Netherlands on 10 December 1950, against France. He was also selected for the 1952 Summer Olympics, where he captained the team during their only match, a 1–5 defeat against Brazil. In total, he gained 19 caps, of which 12 were as captain.

Honours 

 Netherlands Football League Championship:
 1952–53

References 

1921 births
2005 deaths
Footballers from Haarlem
Dutch footballers
Netherlands international footballers
Association football midfielders
Footballers at the 1948 Summer Olympics
Footballers at the 1952 Summer Olympics
Olympic footballers of the Netherlands
Racing Club Heemstede players